Events from the year 1996 in Romania.

Events 

 17 April – President Ion Iliescu and prime minister of Canada Jean Chretien inaugurate the Cernavodă Nuclear Power Plant.
 3 May – Secretary general of NATO, Javier Solana, arrives in Bucharest, assuring that Romania is not forgotten in the expansion plans of the NATO.
 16 September – The prime ministers of Romania and Hungary sign a basic treaty in Timișoara.

See also 
 

 Romania at the 1996 Summer Olympics
 Romania at the 1996 Summer Paralympics

References

External links